Smashy Trashy is the only studio album by American hip hop duo S.A. Smash. It was released by Definitive Jux on June 3, 2003. It peaked at number 14 on CMJ's Hip-Hop chart.

Critical reception

John Bush of AllMusic wrote, "The duo doesn't even stick to a single performance style, ranging from sex-crazed bragging to satirical gangster posturing and down-south balling to underground-type weirdness." Rollie Pemberton of Pitchfork commented that "The reason this album doesn't work is because they don't have the emotional severity and nonchalant allure of commercial artists, they don't have the intelligence and song structure of underground artists, and they can't write a chorus to save their lives."

In 2015, Chaz Kangas of City Pages included "Love to F*ck" on the "Five Aesop Rock Rarities You Might Have Missed" list.

Track listing

References

External links
 
 

2003 debut albums
S.A. Smash albums
Definitive Jux albums
Albums produced by Blockhead (music producer)
Albums produced by El-P